"Hakuna matata" is a Swahili language phrase from East Africa, meaning "no trouble".

Hakuna Matata may also refer to:
Hakuna matata (wasp), species of chalcid wasp from the family Eulophidae
"Hakuna Matata" (song), 1994 song from Disney's animated film The Lion King
Hakuna Matata Restaurant, restaurant in Disneyland Park, Paris, France
Hakuna Matata, or Afrika (video game), 2008 video game